Tatiana Frunză (née Corman; born 25 April 1987) is a Moldovan former footballer who played as a defender. She has officially played for the senior Moldova women's national team.

International career
Frunză capped for Moldova at senior level during the 2007 FIFA Women's World Cup qualification (UEFA second category), as a second half substitution in a 0–3 home loss to Wales on 7 May 2006.

References

1987 births
Living people
Women's association football defenders
Moldovan women's footballers
People from Telenești District
Moldova women's international footballers